Lentibacillus salinarum is a Gram-positive, rod-shaped, moderately halophilic and motile bacterium from the genus of Lentibacillus which has been isolated from a marine solar saltern in Korea.

References

Bacillaceae
Bacteria described in 2008